Valentyn Ivanovych Kravchuk (12 April 1944 – 12 January 2003) was a Ukrainian rower who competed for the Soviet Union in the 1968 Summer Olympics.

He was born in Zhytomyr.

In 1968 he won the bronze medal with the Soviet boat in the eights event.

External links
 Valentyn Kravchuk's profile at Sports Reference.com
 Biography of Valentyn Kravchuk 

1944 births
2003 deaths
Sportspeople from Zhytomyr
Ukrainian male rowers
Soviet male rowers
Olympic rowers of the Soviet Union
Rowers at the 1968 Summer Olympics
Olympic bronze medalists for the Soviet Union
Olympic medalists in rowing
Medalists at the 1968 Summer Olympics